Joseph-Charles Taché, (December 24, 1820 – April 16, 1894) was a member of the Taché family, a nephew of Sir Étienne-Paschal Taché. He was a student at the Petit Séminaire de Québec and followed this by a study of medicine, receiving his medical diploma in 1844.

Taché practised medicine in Rimouski, and, at the age of 27, he was unopposed for a seat in the Legislative Assembly. His activity in politics led him into the newspaper business as a writer renowned for his caustic political wit. He worked as a writer and editor until 1859 when he left Le Courrier du Canada to pursue other writing full-time. He returned to public life in 1864 as a senior civil servant in Ottawa for 24 years in literary, cultural, scientific and political areas. He oversaw the 1871 census.

References

External links
 

1820 births
1894 deaths
Members of the Legislative Assembly of the Province of Canada from Canada East